Michael J. Leitch from the Los Alamos National Laboratory, was awarded the status of Fellow in the American Physical Society, after they were nominated by their Division of Nuclear Physics  in 2000, for his contributions to experimental medium-energy and high-energy nuclear physics, in particular for his lead role in measurements of pion double-charge exchange at low energies, and his leadership in the measurement of nuclear dependencies of J/psi production and of open charm production.

References 

Fellows of the American Physical Society
American physicists
Living people
Year of birth missing (living people)